Christiane Elisabeth Reimann (May 6, 1888, Copenhagen - April 12, 1979, Syracuse, Sicily) was a Danish nurse. She is especially remembered for being the first Danish nurse with a graduate degree in nursing. She was the first paid secretary ("Executive Secretary") of the International Council of Nurses (ICN). 

The ICN's most prestigious award for nursing, the Christiane Reimann Prize, was established in her honor. Reimann also created the official journal of the ICN, the International Nursing Review.

References

Bloch Kjeldsen, Susanne (17. oktober 2014). "Villa på Sicilien afdækker nyt om dansk sygeplejeikon". Sygeplejersken (Dansk Sygeplejeråd) 12/2014: s. 16, 26–31.

1888 births
1979 deaths
People from Copenhagen
International Council of Nurses
Danish nurses